Mount Sedgwick is a prominent  mountain summit located in the Tantalus Range of southwestern British Columbia, Canada. Its nearest higher peak is The Red Tusk,  to the northeast. Precipitation runoff from the peak drains west into tributaries of the Clowhom River, and east into Mill Creek which empties into Howe Sound. The first ascent of the mountain was made in 1909 by H. Dowler. The mountain is named for Adam Sedgwick (1785-1873), one of the founders of modern geology who accompanied Sir Roderick Murchison on geological tours in Canada. The mountain's name was officially adopted on May 3, 1951, by the Geographical Names Board of Canada.


Climate
Based on the Köppen climate classification, Mount Sedgwick is located in the marine west coast climate zone of western North America. Most weather fronts originate in the Pacific Ocean, and travel east toward the Coast Mountains where they are forced upward by the range (Orographic lift), causing them to drop their moisture in the form of rain or snowfall. As a result, the Coast Mountains experience high precipitation, especially during the winter months in the form of snowfall. Temperatures can drop below −20 °C with wind chill factors below −30 °C. The months July through September offer the most favorable weather for climbing Mount Sedgwick.

See also

 Geography of British Columbia
 Geology of British Columbia

References

External links
 Weather forecast: Mount Sedgwick

Two-thousanders of British Columbia
Pacific Ranges
Sea-to-Sky Corridor
New Westminster Land District